Alfons Moog (14 February 1915 – 7 December 1999) was a German international footballer.

References

Sources 
 Alfons Moog at eintracht-archiv.de

1915 births
1999 deaths
Association football defenders
German footballers
Germany international footballers
VfL Köln 99 players
Eintracht Frankfurt players
1. FC Schweinfurt 05 players
Footballers from Rhineland-Palatinate